It was a Dacian fortified town.

External links
Cetatea Bunloc

Dacian fortresses in Brașov County